American Samoa has competed in 6 Summer Games. They also competed in the Winter Olympic Games for the first time at the 1994 Winter Olympics in Lillehammer, Norway. The team most recently competed in the 2022 Winter Olympics in Beijing, People's Republic of China.

Medal tables

Medals by Summer Games

Medals by Winter Games

Flagbearers

See also
 Tropical nations at the Winter Olympics

External links